Carry Me Back is the fourth studio album by folk/country/old time band Old Crow Medicine Show, released on July 17, 2012. It was the group's first release on ATO Records, and their first album produced by Ted Hutt. The album was the band's last to feature founding-member Willie Watson, and the first to feature multi-instrumentalist Cory Younts.

Track listing

Personnel
Old Crow Medicine Show
Kevin Hayes - guitjo, vocals
Morgan Jahnig - bass, percussion
Gill Landry - banjo, vocals, dobro, resophonic guitar
Ketch Secor - fiddle, vocals, harmonica, guitar, banjo
Willie Watson - guitar, vocals, banjo, percussion
Cory Younts - mandolin, vocals, percussion, guitar, keyboards

Special Guests
Critter Fuqua - accordion on "Ways of Man", harmony vocals on "Country Gal"
Jim Lauderdale - harmony vocals on "Ways of Man"

Chart performance

External links
Old Crow Medicine Show (official site)

2012 albums
Albums produced by Ted Hutt
Nettwerk Records albums
Old Crow Medicine Show albums